RTL International was a German-speaking pay-TV channel of RTL Group targeted the global community of German-speaking viewers and tourists with selected programmes from domestic TV channels RTL Television, VOX, RTL Nitro and n-tv. The channel broadcast in non-European countries from January 18, 2016, to May 31, 2017. RTL International replaced RTL Television's previous offer in Southern Africa and Israel and also broadcast for the first time in Australia, Georgia, Canada and the USA.

RTL Group announced on 15 February 2017 that the broadcasting operation will be discontinued as of 31 May 2017. RTL stated that piracy of its content through streaming platforms such as Kodi was to blame, though it had also been offered in extra-cost "German tiers" of some pay-TV providers alone, pricing out viewers from its content.

Distribution
Among the following pay-TV providers, RTL International was available as of November 2016:

 Bell Satellite TV - Canada
 Caucasus Online – Georgia
 Charter Communications – United States
 Deukom – Botswana, Mozambique, Seychelles und South Africa
 flip TV – Australia
 HOT – Israel
 Satelio – Ghana, Kenya, Namibia, Nigeria, Seychelles und Togo
 Silknet – Georgia
 Telus TV - Canada
 Yes – Israel

References

External links
 

Television channels and stations established in 2016
Television channels and stations disestablished in 2017
2016 establishments in Germany
2017 disestablishments in Germany
Defunct television channels in Germany
German-language television stations
International broadcasters
RTL Group
Mass media in Cologne